Jeannot Mwenze Kongolo (1960 – 28 June 2021) was a Congolese politician. He served as the Minister of Internal Affairs of the Democratic Republic of the Congo under the government of President Laurent-Désiré Kabila.

He died on 28 June 2021 at the age of 61.

References

1960 births
2021 deaths
People from Katanga Province
Union for the Congolese Nation politicians
Government ministers of the Democratic Republic of the Congo
21st-century Democratic Republic of the Congo people